Michael Key is an American make-up artist. He was nominated for five and won two Emmy Awards for his makeup artistry on Star Trek: Deep Space Nine in 1993 and 1999.

Career
Key worked on the film Planet of the Apes in 2001, as well as the films Indiana Jones and the Crystal Skull and Batman & Robin. He is the founder of Make-Up Artist Magazine. Key launched the first make-up industry's international trade show called IMATS.

Selected filmography

Indiana Jones and the Kingdom of the Crystal Skull (2008)
The Santa Clause 3: The Escape Clause (2006)
Planet of the Apes (2001)
How the Grinch Stole Christmas (2000)
The 13th Warrior (1999)
The Other Sister (1999)
Charmed (TV series) (1998)
Batman & Robin (1997)
Jingle All the Way (1996)
Down Periscope (1996)
Star Trek: Voyager (1995)
Star Trek Generations (1994)
Star Trek: Deep Space Nine (1993)

References

External links
  Make-Up Artist Magazine
 
 IMATS

Living people
American make-up artists
Emmy Award winners
Place of birth missing (living people)
1962 births